"A Tropical Horror" is a short story by William Hope Hodgson, first published in 1905.

Plot summary
In this story, a ship at sea is attacked by a giant, eel-like sea monster. The story is told from the point of view of the sole survivor, a young apprentice. The creature is aboard the ship for several days and gradually kills and/or eats the remainder of the crew. A second apprentice eventually succeeds in killing the creature, but he is killed in the process.

The end of the story is presented using a literary device in the form of a report from another ship, who has rescued the sole survivor. They validate his story, finding the ship damaged and the crew missing or dead.

This story was adapted into a comic by Gary Gianni in The Dark Horse Book of Monsters by Dark Horse Comics.

References

External links

 

1905 short stories
Horror short stories
Short stories by William Hope Hodgson
Fiction about monsters